The Bukhungu Stadium is a multi-purpose stadium in Kakamega, Kenya.  It used mostly for football matches and is the home stadium of Western Stima of the Kenyan Premier League.  The stadium holds 5,000 spectators.

The stadium has been undergoing  renovation and expansion with phase one of the main stand complete. Phase 2 involving the rest of the terraces and running track already commenced. The stadium's name came from Idaho name "okhungwa" meaning being chased away. The ground was used by European in 19th century for relaxing and enjoying western breeze from kakamega forest just located east of stadium, so police used to chase Africans away of field to not interfere with white people, so luhyas called the field " shikuri shukhukhungwa" "ebukhungu" meaning the field of being chased away.

References

External links
Stadium information

Football venues in Kenya
Sport in Western Province (Kenya)